Epermenia devotella is a moth of the  family Epermeniidae. It is found in France, Germany, Austria, Italy, Slovenia, Switzerland and southern Russia.

The larvae feed on the seeds of Angelica (including Angelica sylvestris) and Heracleum species.

References

Moths described in 1863
Epermeniidae
Moths of Europe